The Tupolev Tu-125 was an unrealized project to develop a new long-range supersonic bomber for the Soviet Air Force. Development commenced in 1958 to replace the newest Tu-22. The "Tu-125" designation was an internal one used by the Tupolev design bureau. Since the aircraft was never built, it never received a military designation.

A canard design was chosen for the aircraft, featuring a delta planform for the wing and stabilizer. Two turbojets (Kuznetsov NK-6 or NK-10 (230–240 kN)) were to be installed in nacelles under the wings. A four-turbojet version, powered by Tumansky R-15B-300s in two nacelles also was considered. The fuselage and wings made from titanium and aluminium alloys.

In September 1962, the Soviet Air Force rejected the project and it was stopped. No aircraft were built.

Specifications (Tu-125 Tumansky engines – estimated)

See also

Notes

References

Tu-0125
1960s Soviet bomber aircraft
Abandoned military aircraft projects of the Soviet Union